The following events occurred in July 1965:

July 1, 1965 (Thursday)
Australia began training its first draftees for the Vietnam War, bringing up the first of 63,790 conscripts who would have two years full-time service in the Australian Regular Army, followed by further service in the army reserves. In all, 804,286 young men who were 20 years old at the time that the draft reactivated, or turned 20 during the Vietnam era, registered for National Service.
The People's Republic of China established its Strategic Missile Force, the Dier Paobing (which simply meant the "Second Artillery"). "Despite its small number of personnel (about 4 percent of the PLA total)," an author has noted, "the SMF has always been allocated the highest percentage of military outlays in the PLA," with 20% of the People's Liberation Army budget.
The U.S. Army combined the 11th Air Assault Division (Test) with the 2nd Infantry Division to form the 1st Cavalry Division (Airmobile), a unique division that included three airborne-qualified battalions and several battalions of helicopters which were integral to its combat elements, allowing it to engage in helicopter assault operations in Vietnam.
George E. Mueller, NASA Associate Administrator for Manned Space Flight, established an "Operations Executive Group" composed of senior executives of government and contractor organizations participating in human spaceflight operations. The group would review Gemini and Apollo program status, resource requirements, management, and flight operations to provide executive management with background needed for effective policy decisions. A second purpose was ensuring that the executives knew each other well enough to work directly in solving time-critical problems rapidly. One-day meetings were to be held at intervals of two to four months.
NASA announced that Frank Borman and James A. Lovell, Jr., had been selected as the prime flight crew for Gemini VII. The backup crew for the flight, which would last up to 14 days, would be Edward H. White II and Michael Collins.
Continental Airlines Flight 12, a Boeing 707-124 with 66 people on board, overran the runway while landing at Kansas City Municipal Airport in Kansas City, Missouri, and broke into three pieces. Coming in during a heavy rain, the plane "hit a pool of water and slid through a fence and across a Missouri River dike", crashing "at almost the same spot" as Continental Flight 290 on January 29, 1963. There were no fatalities.
Born:
Tito Beltrán, Chilean opera singer; in Punta Arenas
Carl Fogarty, British motorcycle racer and winner of the Superbike World Championship in 1994, 1995, 1998 and 1999; in Blackburn, Lancashire
Harald Zwart, Dutch-born Norwegian film director
Died: 
Wally Hammond, 62, English international cricketer and captain of the national team from 1938 to 1947
Robert Ruark, 50, American journalist and syndicated newspaper columnist

July 2, 1965 (Friday)
In the Wimbledon Men's Singles final, Roy Emerson defeated Fred Stolle in straight sets, 6–2, 6–4, 6–4.
The Tunnel Railway had been a tourist attraction in Ramsgate, England, traveling through one of the famed white cliffs on England's west coast, but suffered a catastrophic accident that would lead to its permanent closure, derailing and smashing into a building. As a result, the owners decided to close down the attraction on September 26 at the end of the season, and it would never reopen.
The Equal Employment Opportunity Commission (EEOC) was formed in the United States as Title VII of the Civil Rights Act of 1964 went into effect. The new law prohibited workplace discrimination and the EEOC was authorized to investigate any allegations of discrimination based on race, skin color, religion, sex, or national origin, and initially applied to any companies that had 100 or more employees. Franklin Delano Roosevelt Jr., son of the 32nd president of the United States, served as the first EEOC commissioner.
Because of an administrative error, Richard Speck was released from prison in Huntsville, Texas, after serving only six months of a 16-month sentence for attempted rape. A little more than a year later, Speck would murder eight nurses in Chicago.
Born: Kathryn Erbe, American television actress; in Newton, Massachusetts

July 3, 1965 (Saturday)
Mao Zedong, chairman of the Chinese Communist Party, issued a directive to change educational policy in the People's Republic, commenting that "The burdens of students are too heavy, thus affecting their health, making even study useless," and suggested that school activities should be cut by one-third.
Soviet Communist Party Chief Leonid Brezhnev said that the U.S.S.R. had "orbital missiles", implying that his nation could put nuclear missiles into orbit around the Earth and bring them down, on command, to any location on Earth. The possible existence of missiles in orbit had been referred to at least twice by Soviet media, but it marked the first time that the Soviet Union's leader had suggested their existence. Brezhnev's comments came in an address to graduates of the Voroshilov Military Academy. "It is hardly necessary to give concrete examples of the quantity of intercontinental and orbital rockets at the disposal of the Soviet Union," Brezhnev said. "I can only say one thing. There are enough, quite enough, of them so that once and forever, we can put an end to any aggressor or any group of aggressors."
The Football Association, the governing body for all professional soccer football in England, changed its rules to allow teams to substitute players during a game. Previously, when a player was injured, no replacement was allowed. Initially, a team could make only one substitution during the duration of the game, which would be raised to two in 1986 and three in the 1990s.
"The Meddling Monk" became the first Time Lord (other than the First Doctor and Susan) to make an appearance in the British sci-fi serial, Doctor Who.
On the same day, two different recordings of the song "All I Really Want to Do" entered the Billboard Hot 100 list of best-selling songs in the United States, published by Billboard magazine. The version by Cher, her first single with Sonny Bono, would eventually climb to #15 on the chart, while a shorter recording by The Byrds, who had previously hit #1 with "Mr. Tambourine Man", would reach no higher than #40.
Born:
Shinya Hashimoto, Japanese professional wrestler; in Toki City (d. 2005 from a  brain aneurysm)
Connie Nielsen, Danish actress; in Frederikshavn
Died: Trigger, 33, the horse owned by Roy Rogers and featured in 87 of Rogers's films and television series episodes. After his death, Rogers employed the service of a taxidermist to preserve Trigger's remains, which can still be seen at the Roy Rogers and Dale Evans Museum in Victorville, California.

July 4, 1965 (Sunday)
At a desk placed in front of the base of the Statue of Liberty, U.S. President Lyndon Johnson signed the Immigration and Nationality Act of 1965 into law, abolishing the Emergency Quota Act that had been in place since 1921. The Hart–Cellar Act limited immigration to 170,000 persons per year, but based the number of people from each country on the nations' populations. "The changes that resulted from this renewed migration pattern," a historian would write later, "created fresh images in the cultural and religious landscape that many Americans were not used to encountering. Hindu temples, once only encountered in India, were more routinely seen in U.S. cities. Islam, which had established a strong presence among the African American community, was now also widely practiced by burgeoning immigrant populations in both Shi'a and Sunni expressions of faith."
Martin Luther King Jr. delivered a memorable sermon entitled "The American Dream" at Ebenezer Baptist Church in Atlanta. Following up on his famous "I Have a Dream" speech in the March on Washington in 1963, King said, "So yes, the dream has been shattered, and I have had my nightmarish experiences, but I tell you this morning once more that I haven't lost the faith. I still have a dream..."
The A-6 Intruder attack plane was sent into the Vietnam War for the first time, as several Intruders were launched from the USS Independence on a combat mission.
Born: Constanze Moser-Scandolo, East German Olympic speed skater; in Weimar, Bezirk Erfurt, East Germany
Died:
Lisa Howard, 35, pioneering American television journalist, committed suicide with an overdose of barbiturates
Edward Sackville-West, 63, British music critic, novelist and member of the House of Lords as Baron Sackville

July 5, 1965 (Monday)
Maria Callas gave her final operatic performance, as Tosca at the Royal Opera House, Covent Garden.
Leabua Jonathan became the new Prime Minister of Basutoland (which would become independent from Britain the following year as the Kingdom of Lesotho), after being selected by the colonial parliament to succeed Sekhonyana Maseribane. Jonathan would control the southern African nation for the next 20 years, until being deposed in a coup d'état in 1986.
Died:
Porfirio Rubirosa, 56, Dominican millionaire, race car driver, polo player, and international playboy, was killed in an auto accident in Paris after he lost control of his Ferrari 250 while speeding through the Bois de Boulogne park at about 8:30 in the morning. The day before, Rubirosa and his three teammates had won the Coupe de France polo tournament, and Rubirosa had partied through the night at Jimmy's, a Parisian nightclub.
Coley McDonough, 49, a former National Football League quarterback who had serving as a patrolman for the Pittsburgh Bureau of Police, was shot and killed in the line of duty.  McDonough had played for the Steelers from 1939 to 1941.

July 6, 1965 (Tuesday)
The Council of Ministers of the Soviet Union approved sending 2,500 Soviet Army instructors to North Vietnam, not to fight in combat, but to train North Vietnamese troops on how to use surface-to-air missiles against American airplanes. During the course of the war, between 10,000 and 12,000 Soviet advisers would see service in the Vietnam War.
All 41 Royal Air Force servicemen on a Hastings C1A airplane were killed when the aircraft crashed shortly after takeoff from RAF Abingdon. The Hastings was making its climb when metal fatigue caused two bolts to fail on the craft's elevator and sent it climbing steeply until it stalled and went out of control. The plane was transporting paratroopers of the No. 36 Squadron for a drop over Weston-on-the-Green.
The House of Commons of the United Kingdom voted against the Labour Party government of Prime Minister Harold Wilson on three different attempts at passing the Finance Bill, and MP Edward Heath called upon Wilson and his government to resign so that new elections could be held. On the first vote concerning a limit on investment tax rates, the measure failed 166–180; an amendment proposal failed 167–180, and a motion to adjourn the debate failed by the same measure.
The United States Senate voted 68 to 5 to approve the proposed 25th Amendment to the United States Constitution, clearing the way for the change in presidential succession to be sent to the states for ratification. The amendment also made provisions to fill a vacancy in the office of the U.S. Vice President and created a procedure for the vice president to serve as acting president if the president were to become disabled. The U.S. House of Representatives had already approved the amendment. Voting against the measure were Senators Albert Gore Sr. of Tennessee (whose son would serve as vice president from 1993 to 2001), Walter F. Mondale of Minnesota (who would be vice president from 1977 to 1981), Frank Lausche of Ohio, Eugene McCarthy of Minnesota, and John Tower of Texas.

July 7, 1965 (Wednesday)
Saudi Arabia and Kuwait agreed to partition the "Neutral Zone", a diamond shaped piece of land of about 2,200 square miles or 5,800 square kilometers along the Persian Gulf that had been created by agreement on December 2, 1922. In 1938, oil had been discovered in Kuwait outside of the Zone, and both kingdoms wanted to drill within its boundaries. The two governments agreed to divide the zone along a straight east-west line "close to latitude 28°32' N".
Gemini launch vehicle (GLV) 5 and Gemini spacecraft No. 5 were mechanically mated at complex 19. The Electrical Interface Integrated Validation and Joint Guidance and Control Test began immediately and was completed July 9. The spacecraft/GLV Joint Combined Systems Test followed on July 12. The Flight Configuration Mode Test completed systems testing on July 16.
McDonnell Aircraft completed its 1,000th F-4 Phantom II.
Died: Moshe Sharett, 70, Ukrainian-born politician who served as the second Prime Minister of Israel (1954–1955)

July 8, 1965 (Thursday)
Ronnie Biggs escaped from the maximum security Wandsworth Prison in London, where he was serving a 30-year prison sentence for the August 8, 1963 robbery of the Royal Mail Express train. Biggs would remain free for almost 46 years, living in Brazil from 1970 onward, before finally returning to the United Kingdom on May 7, 2001 to turn himself over to authorities. Returned to prison, he would serve eight years and be released on August 7, 2009. Biggs would pass away on December 18, 2013, at the age of 84, a little more than 50 years after the robbery.
The Convention on Transit Trade of Land-locked States was signed in the United Nations. Under its terms, any signatory nation that had a sea coast was obligated to allow any neighboring landlocked country the right to cross its territory. As of 2012, only 22 coastal nations had signed the convention, "some of which do not even border a landlocked country", along with 18 landlocked nations.
The Vietnam Service Medal was established by Executive Order 11231 for all members of the armed services who served in the Vietnam War.
Bill Moyers became acting White House press secretary as George Reedy took an indefinite leave of absence for surgery.
Gemini Agena target vehicle 5001 completed systems tests in Hanger E and was transferred to complex 14, where it was mated to Atlas standard launch vehicle 5301. Tests began in preparation for a Simultaneous Launch Demonstration on July 22.
NASA Associate Administrator Robert C. Seamans, Jr., named the Deputy Associate Administrator for Programming to coordinate the agency's responses to other governmental agencies regarding post-Apollo program planning and review. At present, Seamans said, considerable interest concerning NASA's post-Apollo plans existed in the space committees of both the Senate and the House of Representatives; the President's Science Advisory Committee; the Office of Science and Technology; the National Aeronautics and Space Council; and the Bureau of the Budget. All were deeply involved in policy planning of direct concern to NASA. During forthcoming months, he emphasized, it was imperative that various program presentations and agency planning statements accurately reflect thinking of the agency's top leadership and that no contradictory positions be made outside the agency. This was essential, he said, "because of the very sensitive nature of many of the program options open to us and because of the intimate links between the NASA program and those of other major agencies."
Jim Morrison ran into former UCLA classmate Ray Manzarek in Venice Beach, California, at approximately 1:00 P.M. local time. After hearing some of Morrison's songs, Manzarek agreed to form The Doors with him.
A bomb exploded in a rear lavatory aboard Canadian Pacific Airlines Flight 21 in mid-air over British Columbia, blowing the tail section off. The aircraft crashed, killing all 52 people on board. The plane, a four-engine Douglas DC-6B, had taken off from Vancouver en route to Whitehorse, the capital of the then-Yukon Territory, with three scheduled stops. No suspect would ever be charged for the bombing.
Died:
Gunamudian David Boaz, 57, who became the first Indian psychologist after receiving his Ph.D. from Oxford University in 1943
Emil Heitz, 72, German-born Swiss geneticist
Paul Mantz, 61, American air racer and stunt pilot, was killed in a plane crash during filming of The Flight of the Phoenix

July 9, 1965 (Friday)
The United States Senate approved its version of the Medicare Act by a vote of 68–21, after the House of Representatives had passed a different version in April, 313–115. Both houses would approve a House–Senate conference revision at the end of the month, and the federal health care legislation would be signed into law by President Johnson. 
The U.S. House of Representatives would vote 333 to 85 to pass the Voting Rights Act of 1965 after the U.S. Senate had approved a similar measure. 

The flashcube was introduced by the American camera manufacturer Kodak at its factory in Rochester, New York, as an accessory that would allow flash photography on its small Instamatic cameras for indoor picture taking.  Developed in conjunction with Sylvania Electric Products, the disposable flashcube allowed an amateur photographer to take four flash images in rapid succession without having to change the bulb.
Pope Paul VI appointed Adolph Marx the first Roman Catholic bishop of the Roman Catholic Diocese of Brownsville, in Brownsville, Texas. 
The release of the Tamil musical film Aayirathil Oruvan marked the end of the composing partnership between T. K. Ramamoorthy and M. S. Viswanathan.
Mass demonstrations in Guayaquil, Ecuador led to days of violent conflict with police and military.
Born: Luis Pereyra, Argentine tango dancer and choreographer; in Santiago del Estero
Died: L. H. Gray, 59, English physicist and inventor of the field of radiobiology, died after having a stroke. The "gray", a measure of absorbed radiation dose equivalent to one joule of radiation energy per kilogram of matter, was named in his honor by creators of the International System of Units

July 10, 1965 (Saturday)
Two F-4C Phantom II fighters of the 45th Tactical Fighter Squadron shot down two MiG-17 fighters over North Vietnam, scoring the first U.S. Air Force aerial victories of the Vietnam War.
Ten years into the First Sudanese Civil War between Muslims in the north and Christians in the south, Muslim Sudanese troops retaliated for an unsuccessful raid by the Anya Nya separatists on the Sudanese Army headquarters in Juba (now the capital of South Sudan). Over the next two days, according to official government figures from the Sudanese government in Khartoum, 1,018 civilians died after their neighborhoods were cordoned off and set on fire.
U.S. Secretary of the Treasury Henry H. Fowler announced a change in American monetary policy in an address at Hot Springs, Virginia, titled "A Strong, Stable Dollar". Economist John S. Odell would comment later that "Fowler's speech stunned the international financial world" in that he said that the United States was ready to participate in a world monetary conference for the purpose of reforming current arrangements to provide international liquidity; "This reversal of American policy was, in retrospect", Odell would write, "one of the most significant shifts of the last two decades. It ushered in a lengthy multilateral negotiating process" that would, in 1969, create the Special Drawing Rights on the International Monetary Fund, "creating a new synthetic international reserve asset" to rival the American dollar.
Born: Alexia Morales, first child of King Constantine II of Greece and his wife, Queen Anne-Marie; in Mon Repos, Corfu. Until the birth of her brother in 1967, Alexia (the niece of the future Queen Margrethe II of Denmark and the future King Juan Carlos I of Spain) would be the heir presumptive to the Greek throne. The monarchy would be abolished in 1974.
Died:
Jacques Audiberti, 66, French playwright
T. S. Stribling, 84, Pulitzer Prize-winning American novelist

July 11, 1965 (Sunday)
People attending a wedding in the South Sudanese city of Wau were killed by Sudanese government troops, who surrounded the cathedral where the ceremonies were taking place. After allowing four soldiers in the wedding party to leave, the troops fired on civilians as they departed, killing 75 of them.
One year after the East African republics of Tanganyika and Zanzibar had merged to form Tanzania, the government proumulgated the new nation's first Constitution and eliminated all political parties except for the Tanganyika African National Union (TANU) and Zanzibar's Afro-Shirazi Party.
All 52 people on board a Skyways Coach-Air (including a baby) survived its crash after the HS 748 turboprop landed heavily on a grass runway at Lympne Airport, Kent, England, dug in its nose wheel, overturned three times, broke in two and ended up upside down. Three people were hospitalized with only minor injuries. The plane was returning across the English Channel from Beauvais in France in a heavy rain, and a Ministry of Aviation official commented the next day that "it was a miracle that the aircraft did not catch fire and explode". All three of the crew and the 48 passengers were strapped in their seats and facing head down. Captain Jeff Smith and stewardess Ann Playfoot freed the passengers and rushed them through emergency exits. Playfoot would comment afterward, "When I first saw everyone with their heads hanging upside down, it could have looked so comical if it hadn't been so serious."
A U.S. Air Force 551st Airborne Early Warning and Control Wing EC-121H Warning Star crashed in the Atlantic Ocean off Nantucket, Massachusetts, killing 16 of the 19-man crew. The three survivors were located after daybreak after spending hours staying afloat in chilly water wearing life jackets.
President Johnson ordered the Federal Bureau of Investigation to remove all illegal wiretaps that the FBI had placed to conduct surveillance of organized crime figures, "not just shutting off the tape recorders, but physically removing every bug the special agents had installed". "[T]he removal order placed the G-men in great peril," an historian would note later, "as they once again had to surreptitiously enter the mob hangouts and pull out the sources of their hard-won intelligence."
Born: Ernesto Hoost, Dutch kickboxer and four-time world champion; in Heemskerk

July 12, 1965 (Monday)
In the Trust Territory of the Pacific Islands, the First Congress of Micronesia took place, with representatives from the Marshall Islands, the Northern Mariana Islands, Palau and the islands of Chuuk, Ponape, and Yap. The first order of business was to adopt an official flag of Micronesia. The Congress would eventually draft a constitution for the Federated States of Micronesia, although the Marshalls, the Northern Marianas and Palau would separate from the FSM to become their own independent nations.
The issuance of Circular 10/65 by the United Kingdom's Department of Education and Science transformed the state education system in England and Wales, an event that journalist Stephen Pollard listed as one of the "Ten Days that Changed the Nation". The new "Comprehensive System" replaced the "Tripartite System" of selective schools where students were tested and placed according to measurements of their abilities. After describing a resolution passed in the House of Commons of "the need to raise educational standards at all levels" and the opinion that "the realisation of this objective is impeded by the separation of children into different types of secondary schools", the Circular declared that "The Secretary of State accordingly requests local educational authorities, if they have not already done so, to prepare and submit to him plans for reorganising secondary education in their areas on comprehensive lines," although the submission of plans was not optional.
NASA Headquarters Gemini Program Office informed Manned Spacecraft Center that it had decided to delete extravehicular activity from Gemini missions 5, 6, and 7.
Born: Sanjay Manjrekar, Indian international cricketer; in Mangalore, Karnataka state

July 13, 1965 (Tuesday)
U.S. Army Sergeant First Class Isaac Camancho arrived in South Vietnam, after becoming the first American prisoner of war to successfully escape from a Viet Cong prison camp. Four days earlier, Camancho had managed to pry loose a bar on a bamboo cage where he had been kept at night, after having been captured 19 months earlier on November 24, 1963.
A U.S. Navy sailor on the aircraft carrier USS Shangri-La accidentally jettisoned  of bunker oil, described as "the thickest, heaviest, most molasses-like of all petroleum fuels", into the Mediterranean Sea along the a stretch of tourist beaches at the French Riviera, polluting the sand along a  stretch that ran from Cannes to La Napoule in France. The beach was reopened at the end of the day.
Leonard H. Marks was named director of the United States Information Agency.
The U.S. House of Representatives voted 265–103 to require a warning label on all packages of cigarettes sold in the United States on or after January 1, 1966, with the text "Caution: Cigarette smoking may be hazardous to your health." The measure had previously passed the U.S. Senate. President Johnson would sign the bill into law on July 27.

July 14, 1965 (Wednesday)
The U.K. House of Commons voted 200–96 to abolish the death penalty for murder. 
The U.S. House of Representatives voted 255–151 to eliminate silver from American quarters and dimes, and to reduce the amount of silver in the half dollar from 90 percent to 40 percent. All future 10-cent and 25-cent coins would consist of 75% copper in the middle, and 12.5% nickel for the obverse and reverse sides of the coins. The vote was split along regional lines, opposed by Congressmen from the western United States that had silver mines, and supported by those from the New England states, where manufacturers of tableware, jewelry, electronics, and photographic supplies had been affected by the increasing shortage of silver.
The Older Americans Act was signed into law by U.S. President Johnson.
The Tour de France was won by Felice Gimondi of Italy. For the first time in the Tour's history, it started in Germany. In second place, 2 minutes and 40 seconds behind Gimondi, was Raymond Poulidor of France, who would finish in second place twice, and third place five times, but would never win the Tour de France in 14 attempts. 
Australian athlete Ron Clarke broke the world record for the 10,000 meter race, becoming the first person to run the distance in less than 28 minutes and finishing the 10K at the Bislet Stadium in Oslo at 27 minutes, 39.4 seconds.
Died: Adlai Stevenson, the U.S. Ambassador to the United Nations since 1961, collapsed and died of a heart attack in London after walking out of the American Embassy. Stevenson, who had lost the general election for U.S. President to Dwight Eisenhower in both 1952 and 1956, was walking with the U.S. representative to the U.N. Trusteeship Council when he was stricken at 5:15 p.m., and died in an ambulance while being rushed to a hospital.
Died: Max Woosnam, 72, English tennis, soccer football, cricket, and snooker player celebrated as "The Greatest British Sportsman"

July 15, 1965 (Thursday)

A measurement of the changes in radio transmissions as the signals passed through the Martian atmosphere also showed that the surface pressure was 94% less than had been predicted, leading to the conclusion that it was mostly carbon dioxide and that the Martian ice caps were actually frozen CO2 or dry ice. The transmission of 22 pictures "was no simple matter" and relied upon film exposures being "processed internally on a convoluted series of rollers", then scanned to produce radio signals "with pulses corresponding to the light or dark areas on the negatives" at the rate of eight bits per second, which meant that each picture took eight hours to transmit.
According to an Associated Press report, six people stationed at the air traffic control tower reported that the object remained in place for 40 minutes but disappeared when a Royal Australian Air Force plane was sent to identify it. The phenomenon followed reports of sightings the previous week in England, France, and the Azores.
Greek Prime Minister Georgios Papandreou and his government were dismissed by King Constantine II, after the King rejected Papandreou's demand to be made the new Defense Minister and rejected his proposal to bar military officers from participating in politics. The King swore in another member of Papandreou's Center Union party, Georgios Athanasiadis-Novas.
Born: David Miliband, British politician; in London

July 16, 1965 (Friday)
Three months after a commitment by China's President Liu Shaoqi to provide Chinese pilots to fight in North Vietnam, the Chinese General Staff notified North Vietnam's Defense Ministry that "the time was not appropriate" to supply the assistance. "Whatever the reasons for China's decision”, an author would note later, "the failure to satisfy Hanoi's demand must have greatly disappointed the Vietnamese since the control of the air was so crucial for the DRV's effort to protect itself from the ferocious U.S. bombing."
The Mont Blanc Tunnel was inaugurated by Presidents Giuseppe Saragat of Italy and Charles de Gaulle of France. President Saragat drove from Courmayeur in Italy, traveling  in the tunnel bored into the Alps, to Chamonix in France, where he was welcomed by President De Gaulle for ceremonies. The two men then rode together back to Italy, where further ceremonies took place. As the world's longest highway tunnel, the Mont Blanc replaced the former route, "60 miles of travel over hairpin turns on the mountain barrier".
The word "Powellism" was used by Iain Macleod, writing in The Spectator, to describe right-wing Tory Enoch Powell's views on economics. It would come to be used in a wider sense as Powell became a controversial figure in British politics.

July 17, 1965 (Saturday)
Representatives of West Germany's Ministry of Scientific Research and the American space agency NASA signed an agreement for joint development of the first independent German satellite project, with each side to bear its own costs.
The second North American XB-70 Valkyrie bomber prototype made its maiden flight between Air Force Plant 42 and Edwards Air Force Base.
Born:
Andrea Barrett, American novelist; in Boston
Santiago Segura, Spanish film director; in Madrid
Alex Winter, American film actor; in London to American and Australian parents
Died: Sabato "Simon" Rodia, 86, Italian-born American artist who created the Watts Towers sculpture that is now a historical landmark in Los Angeles

July 18, 1965 (Sunday)
A three-day period of extreme winter weather began in Australia. Snow was recorded as far north as the Clarke Range in Queensland, killing drought-weakened livestock.
The Soviet Union launched the Zond 3 lunar probe from an orbiting platform that had been put into space two days earlier. On July 16, the Proton 1 had set a new record for the heaviest payload placed into an Earth orbit. Sent in part to test the Soviet Union's technology for taking and transmitting higher-resolution images than had been sent by previous Soviet vehicles, the Zond-3 would take new photographs of the far side of the Moon.
The first All-Africa Games opened in Brazzaville, Republic of the Congo. The next day, Ahmed Djelli of Algeria won the first gold medal of the games, winning a  race from Brazzaville to Kinkala. Future Olympic medalist Kip Keino of Kenya won the 1,500 meter race on July 22.
James "Bing" Davidson, a 26-year-old bit part actor and companion of actor Paul Lynde, fell to his death from the 8th floor of the Sir Francis Drake Hotel in San Francisco, after a night of drinking and a bad decision to "do a trick" that involved hanging from the outside ledge and then pulling himself back up. As witnesses watched, Davidson tried three times to climb back into the window and hung by his fingertips before losing his grip after two minutes.

July 19, 1965 (Monday)
Air strikes by two F-100s of the 481st Tactical Fighter Squadron were credited with "probably saving the camp that night".
Soviet Premier Alexei Kosygin addressed an audience at Riga on the 25th anniversary of the 1940 "liberation" of an independent Latvia and its annexation by the Soviet Union, and surprised his audience by acknowledging the problem of prejudice against the Jewish people. "Nationalism, Great Power chauvinism, racism and anti-Semitism", he noted, "are completely alien to our society... and our mirovozzrenie", a reference to the Soviet overall view of the world.
The West African nation of Ghana abandoned the Ghanaian pound that it had used since independence, and issued his new decimal currency. Replacing the pound worth 20 shillings or 120 pence was the cedi, worth 100 pesewas.

Filming began on the second television pilot for Gene Roddenberry's proposed science fiction series, Star Trek, with only one member of the cast from the first pilot. "Where No Man Has Gone Before" retained actor Leonard Nimoy as "Mr. Spock", who had played the same role in the first pilot, "The Cage", but now featured Canadian actor William Shatner in the lead role as the starship's captain.
Born: Evelyn Glennie, Scottish percussionist; in Aberdeenshire
Died:
Syngman Rhee, 90, the first President of South Korea, serving from 1948 to 1960
Clyde Beatty, 62, American circus performer and owner
Ingrid Jonker, 32, South African poet, by suicide

July 20, 1965 (Tuesday)
Li Zongren (Li Tsung-jen), who had served as the acting President of the Republic of China during 1949 before it fell to the Communists later in the year, returned to Beijing after nearly 16 years of self-imposed exile in the United States. General Li pledged support to the People's Republic of China and said that he was making up for his "guilty past", and was welcomed by Prime Minister Zhou Enlai. Li, who would urge other former officials to return home from Taiwan, had sold his home in New York until June, then traveled to Zurich and spent a month there before flying back to Mainland China.
Police in Saigon foiled a plot to assassinate outgoing U.S. Ambassador to South Vietnam Maxwell D. Taylor, 15 minutes before he was scheduled to enter a stadium for South Vietnam's "National Unity Day for the Liberation of North Viet Nam" rally. Viet Cong members had placed a shrapnel-loaded bomb at a cemetery across the street from the entrance that Taylor was to use. A similar-sized bomb had killed 43 people at the My Canh restaurant on June 25.
Arthur J. Goldberg resigned from his lifetime appointment as a Justice of the United States Supreme Court to accept the nomination as the new U.S. Ambassador to the United Nations, filling the vacancy created by the death of Adlai Stevenson.
Columbia Records released rock musician Bob Dylan's influential single "Like a Rolling Stone" in the United States.

July 21, 1965 (Wednesday)
The National Congress of Fiji called a meeting of Fijian and European members of the Legislative Council, with the eventual intention of forming a new political party under Kamisese Mara.
President Johnson convened his advisers in a meeting of the 15-member National Security Council at the White House, prior to making a decision about the direction that the United States should take in fighting the Vietnam War. During the morning session, George Ball, the United States Under Secretary of State, strongly argued against the recommendation by Secretary of Defense Robert S. McNamara to increase the number of American troops in South Vietnam. Before adjourning at 1:00, the President gave Ball 90 minutes to prepare a last-ditch attempt to stop the war from escalating. According to minutes of that day's meeting that would be released years later, Ball urged that the U.S. should "cut its losses" and allow the South Vietnamese government to "do what seems natural to it, let it fall apart" and, with the rest of the advisers against him, closed with the prophetic statement that South Vietnam would ultimately lose to the Viet Cong guerrillas, regardless of McNamara's plans to commit 175,000 additional troops, that the U.S. would not get out with a victory, and that "we'll double our bet and get lost in the rice paddies."
Born: Guðni Bergsson, Icelandic soccer football star; in Reykjavik

July 22, 1965 (Thursday)
Sir Alec Douglas-Home suddenly resigned as a head of the British Conservative Party. Home, a former prime minister, did not give a reason for his resignation other than to say that his successor should have the chance to consolidate the party before the next parliamentary elections. Opinion polls had shown a drop in approval of the Conservative Party prior to Home's departure; MP Reggie Maudling would say later that, "As usually happens in the Conservative Party, the old rules of public life applied, namely that there is no gratitude in politics, and you should never kick a man until he is down."
Canada Post letter carriers in Montreal walked off the job, touching off a series of strikes across Canada. Members of the Postal Workers' Brotherhood in Vancouver went on strike later in the day, and Toronto members of the Federated Association of Letter Carriers followed the next day.
A Simultaneous Launch Demonstration (SLD) was conducted between the Gemini Atlas-Agena target vehicle on complex 14 and Gemini-Titan (GT) 5 on complex 19, in conjunction with the Wet Mock Simulated Launch (WMSL) of GT-5. The Gemini launch vehicle tanking exercise, normally a part of WMSL, was conducted separately for convenience on July 17. SLD was a dress rehearsal to demonstrate the coordination required to conduct a single countdown on two vehicles and was subsequently performed on all rendezvous missions. The mission control centers at Houston and Cape Kennedy, as well as Eastern Test Range support facilities, were integral parts of the combined countdown. A failure in the Houston computer system caused several spurious commands to be transmitted to the target vehicle. Although some of these commands were accepted, results were not serious because they were mostly stored program command loads. Following SLD, the Atlas and Agena were demated on July 26.
Edward Z. Gray, Director, Advanced Manned Missions Program at NASA HQ, informed the Center Directors at MSC, Marshall Space Flight Center (MSFC), and Kennedy Space Center (KSC) of significant recent program decisions on the approach to be followed during Fiscal Year 1966 in defining payload integration for the Apollo Extension System (AES) to the extent necessary for awarding major project contracts approximately a year later. In defining AES activity, Gray said, the Centers must follow the phased approach, with definition phase contracts to be awarded competitively to industry about the first of 1966. These contracts, to run for about five months, were to include the several companies' proposals for accomplishing the payload integration effort for all AES flights and would form the basis for NASA's final choice of integration contractors. Current plans, Gray said, were based on selection of two such payload integration contractors, one at MSC and the second at MSFC, each responsible for about half of all AES flights. (During the integration definition phase contracts, however, MSC had lead responsibility for competition and selection of study contractors, with participation by MSFC and KSC. Gray authorized MSC to supplement the existing AES study contracts with North American and Grumman to assist in the payload integration definition effort.)
Born: Shawn Michaels (ring name for Michael Shawn Hickenbottom), American professional wrestler; in Chandler, Arizona

July 23, 1965 (Friday)
Israel's Mapai Party expelled its longtime leader, David Ben-Gurion.
The 1965 World Archery Championships concluded in Sweden.
The City of London Corporation announced that the famous London Bridge over the Thames River, last rebuilt in 1831, was cracking and gradually sinking, and that the span would be replaced by a new concrete structure.
Pope Paul VI established the Roman Catholic Diocese of Los Teques.
Only a few minutes after taking off from Williamsport, Pennsylvania, the pilot of Allegheny Airlines Flight 604 saved the other 39 people on board after the left engine caught fire. Unable to return to the airport, Captain Allan J. Lauber guided the Convair to a crash landing near the small township of Loyalsock. As it was being guided to an open field, the plane hit power lines, and narrowly missed a barn and the Good Shepherd Episcopal Church. Thirty-three of the people, including Lauber, were hospitalized, though none were in critical condition.
President Johnson signed the U.S. Coinage Act of 1965 into law, reducing silver content in half dollars from 90% to 40%, and eliminating silver from dimes and quarters.
Air Force Space Systems Division formally accepted delivery of Gemini Agena target vehicle (GATV) 5002 after the vehicle acceptance team inspection had been completed. The vehicle was then shipped by air to Eastern Test Range on July 24, arriving July 25. Although GATV 5002 was accepted, several items of equipment remained in "not qualified" status, including the shroud, secondary and primary propulsion systems, and components of both the electrical power and command systems.
Gemini-Titan (GT) 5 was demated following completion of the Wet Mock Simulated Launch to allow the spacecraft fuel cells to be replaced and the coolant bypass to be modified. Spacecraft and launch vehicle were remated August 5. Modified Electrical Interface Integrated Validation and the Joint Guidance and Control Tests were run on August 6. Spacecraft Final Systems Test on August 9-10 and the Simulated Flight Test on August 13 completed prelaunch testing of GT-5, scheduled for launch August 19.
Standard Agena D (AD-108), which had been completed in June 1965 and held in storage, was transferred to Building 104 at Sunnyvale, California, for modifications and final assembly as Gemini Agena target vehicle 5003. While in storage, several pieces of AD-108 equipment had been removed for modification to the Gemini configuration. Final assembly began August 8.
Born: Slash (stage name for Saul Hudson), British-born rock guitarist for Guns N' Roses; in Hampstead, London

July 24, 1965 (Saturday)
American pilots encountered surface-to-air missiles (SAMs) for the first time in the Vietnam War, as an F-4 Phantom II jet and its crew of two USAF officers was shot down by a Soviet-made S-75 Dvina (referred to in the West as the SA-2 Guideline missile). Captain Roscoe Henry Fobair was killed, while the other officer, Captain Richard Paul Keirn, survived and would remain a prisoner of war for seven years and seven months. Captain Keirn had been a POW during World War II, and became one of only two Americans to be captured as a prisoner in two wars. Captain Keirn was also the first pilot in the war to be shot down by a surface-to-air missile, when his F-4 Phantom was struck on 24 July 1965. Overall, less than two percent of the 9,000 SAMs fired would actually strike U.S. planes during the war; of the 3,000 American planes shot down, 85% were taken out by antiaircraft guns, 8% by missiles, and 7% by enemy aircraft.
With members of the Turkish Cypriot community boycotting the legislature, the House of Representatives in Cyprus voted unanimously to re-elect Archbishop Makarios III as president to an additional five-year term, and to extend their own terms through 1970 as well, without conducting elections. Under the constitution, the Greek Cypriot legislators had a 70% majority even before the Turkish Cypriot members began avoiding Parliament in 1963.
Geophysicist J. Tuzo Wilson announced a major discovery in plate tectonics with the publication in the journal Nature of his paper, "A New Class of Faults and Their Bearing on Continental Drift", describing the "transform fault", a boundary between tectonic plates characterized by a horizontal motion.
Died: 
Constance Bennett, 60, American film actress
Irene Browne, 69, British stage and film actress
Loucye Gordy Wakefield, 41, American music executive who operated the music publishing division of Motown Records.

July 25, 1965 (Sunday)
Tunku Abdul Rahman, the Prime Minister of Malaysia, made the decision that Singapore should leave the Federation of Malaysia and become its own separate nation, and informed the leaders of Singapore's People's Action Party of his choice. The other alternative that he had considered was to impose federation rule upon the area in order to control unrest among Singapore's predominantly Chinese residents, and the Malay people in the rest of the federation. On August 9, the separation of Singapore from Malaysia would be announced.
Ma'rib, the last area in eastern Yemen to support the Yemen Arab Republic that had toppled the King of Yemen in 1962, fell to Royalist forces led by the former King's brother, Prince Abdullah al-Badr. An author would later write that the fall of Ma'rib meant that "it was possible to travel from the Federation to Saudi Arabia across territory held by Royalist forces or tribes loyal to the Imam for the first time since the outbreak of the conflict."
Américo Tomás was re-elected to a second seven-year term as President of Portugal, as the only candidate under consideration by the 585-member electoral college. Sixteen of the members refused to cast a ballot in protest over the indirect suffrage system used to select a chief executive. Tomás had few powers in the European nation, which had been controlled by Prime Minister António de Oliveira Salazar for 33 years.
Bob Dylan upset many of his fans at the Newport Folk Festival purists by "going electric" in a live performance, but opened the era of folk rock, with the themes of folk music accompanied by the electric guitar. An author who was present at the festival would write later that it was a myth that Dylan had been booed as he played. After his three-song set, Dylan returned to the stage later in the show and played "It's All Over Now, Baby Blue" on an acoustic guitar.
Martin Luther King Jr. addressed a crowd of over 8,000 in Winnetka, Illinois, after several other speeches in Chicago that day. Addressing the issue of discrimination in housing, he told the mostly white crowd that "we must now come together as brothers or perish as fools."
Casey Stengel, the 74-year-old manager of the New York Mets baseball team, broke his hip the day after coaching the team in a 5–1 loss to the Philadelphia Phillies. Stengel, who had announced that he would be retiring from the game at the end of the 1965 season, chose pitching coach Wes Westrum as his replacement and would retire a month earlier than originally planned.
Died: Freddie Mills, 46, English boxer who was the world light heavyweight champion from 1948 to 1950, died of a self-inflicted gunshot wound. Mills was dead on arrival at Middlesex Hospital after police found him in his car in an alley near his nightclub, the Freddie Mills Nite Spot, on Charing Cross Road in London. An inquest would later rule that he had committed suicide.

July 26, 1965 (Monday)
The Free Papua Movement (Organisasi Papua Merdeka or OPM), seeking the independence of the West Papua region from Indonesia, made its first attack on the Indonesian Army, as forestry workers struck during a flag raising ceremony in Manokwari.
The Maldives, a set of inhabited islands in the Indian Ocean, were granted full independence from the United Kingdom in a ceremony held at the residence of the British High Commissioner in Colombo, Sri Lanka. Muhammad Fareed Didi continued as Sultan of the constitutional monarchy, and Ibrahim Nasir Rannabandeyri Kilegefan (who would become the nation's first president in 1968) served as the first prime minister.
Atlas standard launch vehicle 5301 and Gemini Agena target vehicle (GATV) 5001 were demated at complex 14, following the Simultaneous Launch Demonstration of July 22. GATV 5001 was returned to Hanger E, where it was stored as the backup vehicle for GATV 5002. On August 18, GATV 5002 was officially designated as the target vehicle for Gemini VI, the first rendezvous mission, while GATV 5001 was to be maintained in flight-ready condition as backup. Atlas 5301, which had been returned to Hanger J after demating, was moved back to complex 14 on August 16 to serve as the target launch vehicle for GATV 5002.
Mario Savio, the 22-year-old leader of the Free Speech Movement at the University of California in Berkeley, was sentenced to 120 days in jail for his part in leading the sit-in at the administration building in December. Savio's sentence, the longest meted out by Berkeley Municipal Judge Rupert Crittenden, came after he rejected an offer of probation conditioned on not taking part in future protest demonstrations.
Born:
Vladimir Cruz, Cuban film actor and director; in Villa Clara
Jeremy Piven, American television actor (Entourage''); in New York City

July 27, 1965 (Tuesday)
The first successful reattachment of a completely amputated thumb was performed by two Japanese surgeons, Dr. Shigeo Komatsu and Dr. Susumu Tamai, at the Nara Medical University in Kashihara.
American aircraft struck a surface-to-air missile installation for the first time, attacking an SA-2 Guideline site in North Vietnam. "Operation Spring High" took off with 46 Republic F-105 Thunderchief fighter-bombers and 58 other supporting aircraft to bomb the sites, losing six planes in the process and destroying only one of the two targets, designated as "site 6". Afterward, "bomb damage assessment photos disclosed that there was a dummy missile in site 6, placed there as a trap, and that site 7 was empty."
Edward Heath was elected the new leader of the United Kingdom's Conservative Party as 298 of the 303 Tory members of the House of Commons voted in "a narrow oakpaneled corridor of parliament". The result was announced at 2:17 "without a single hurrah from anyone's supporter", with Heath receiving 150, Reggie Maudling 133, and Enoch Powell 15. Although the party's bylaws required a runoff if no candidate received two-thirds of the vote, Maudling acknowledged that "Mr. Heath has attained an over-all majority on the first ballot," and declined to participate in a second vote between the top two finishers.
Queen Elizabeth II became the first British monarch to ride on the hovercraft, until the ship's engine broke down. She and Prince Philip were ferried ashore while repairs were made.
Gemini Program Manager Charles W. Mathews initiated a spacecraft manager program by assigning one engineer to Gemini spacecraft No. 5 and another to spacecraft No. 6. Assignments to other spacecraft would come later. Following the precedent established in Project Mercury and then in Gemini by Martin, McDonnell, and Aerojet-General, one person would follow the spacecraft from manufacturing through testing to launch, serving as a source of up-to-date information on their spacecraft and calling attention to particular problem areas.
Born: 
José Luis Chilavert, goalkeeper for Paraguay's national soccer football team; in Luque
Trifon Ivanov, defender for Bulgaria's national soccer football team; in Veliko Tarnovo (d. 2016)
Sam Lawson, Selina Lawson, Shirlene Lawson, Lisa Lawson, and Deborah Lawson, the first quintuplets to be conceived following the use of fertility medication and the first to be born in New Zealand; in Auckland. The five children were all descendants of Fletcher Christian, who had led the mutiny on the ship HMS Bounty in 1789. Their mother, former beauty queen Ann Lawson, would be murdered by her second husband in 1982.

July 28, 1965 (Wednesday)
In a nationally televised speech, President Johnson announced his decision to send an additional 50,000 American troops to South Vietnam, increasing the number of personnel there by two-thirds and to bring the commitment to 125,000. Johnson also said that the monthly draft call would more than double, to more than 1,000 new young men per day (from 17,000 to 35,000) for enlistment and training in the U.S. Armed Forces. Johnson timed the speech for the noon hour in Washington, D.C., when there were fewer television viewers. As one historian would later note, "At 12:33 PM on July 28, 1965— without going before Congress, without a prime-time address to the nation— President Lyndon Johnson committed the United States to a land war in Southeast Asia."
Abe Fortas, described as one of the closest personal friends of President Johnson, was nominated to become the new associate justice of the United States Supreme Court, to replace Arthur Goldberg. Fortas would resign from the Supreme Court in 1969 after being implicated in a scandal.
The U.S. Senate voted, 70–24, to ratify the Medicare bill for President Johnson's signature. The House of Representatives had approved the compromise the day before, 307–116.
Pierre Harmel became the new Prime Minister of Belgium, and would serve as the head of government for eight months.
Died: Edogawa Ranpo, 70, Japanese mystery novelist

July 29, 1965 (Thursday)
The first 4,000 101st Airborne Division paratroopers arrived in Vietnam, landing at Cam Ranh Bay.
The governments of Algeria and France signed an agreement which allowed French petroleum companies to retain their concessions for the right to drill for oil in Algeria, but required also that they cooperate with Algeria's government-owned oil and gas consortium, Société Nationale pour la Recherche, la Production, le Transport, la Transformation, et la Commercialisation des Hydrocarbures (Sonatrach).
Born: Chang-Rae Lee, Korean-born American novelist, in Seoul, South Korea

July 30, 1965 (Friday)

In a ceremony at the Truman Presidential Library in Independence, Missouri, President Johnson signed the Social Security Act of 1965 into law, establishing Medicare and Medicaid. As president, Harry S. Truman had first proposed nationwide health care for the elderly, but had failed to gain passage of a bill. "I'm glad to have lived this long," Truman said in a speech introducing Johnson, then told the new president, "Your inspired leadership and an understanding Congress have brought this about."
The final report on a modular multipurpose space station was delivered to MSC by the Spacecraft Organization of Lockheed-California Company. The concept provided for a sequential evolution of space vehicles ranging from small Apollo-dependent laboratories, through larger, more versatile laboratories, to a semipermanent space station. Initial objectives of the study were to refine and optimize the design of the large orbital research laboratory. Eight tasks were defined by NASA to fulfill the intent of those objectives; but later, at NASA direction, efforts were concentrated on "Experiments and Utilization" and "Design of Modular Concepts," two of the original tasks. The other tasks were reduced in scope or terminated. The ultimate objectives of the program were conceptual investigation of a family of space stations utilizing the modular, or building block, concept and integration of a broad spectrum of experiments and applications into this family of space stations. The study was a follow-on effort to "Study of a Rotating Manned Orbital Space Station," performed for MSC, by Lockheed. The modular concept, as defined in the study, could be applied to a wide variety of missions and configurations.
Died: Jun'ichirō Tanizaki, 79, Japanese novelist

July 31, 1965 (Saturday)
With a nationwide ban going into effect on August 1, the very last cigarette commercial on British television was broadcast. The final telly ad was for Rothmans cigarettes.
Canada's nationwide postal workers' strike came to an end after letter carriers returned to work across the nation, with the exception of the city of Montreal, where the first walkout had started. The 4,100 workers in and around Montreal would return to work on August 9.
Born: J. K. Rowling, British novelist who created the best-selling Harry Potter book series; as Joanne Rowling in Yate, Gloucestershire
Died: André Godard, 84, French archaeologist and architect

References

1965
1965-07
1965-07